VSOP may refer to:

Music
V.S.O.P. (group), a jazz group featuring Herbie Hancock
VSOP (album), an album by Herbie Hancock
"V.S.O.P.", a song by Above the Law from Black Mafia Life
"V.S.O.P." (K. Michelle song), a song by K. Michelle from Rebellious Soul

Acronyms
Very Small Outline Package, a type of surface-mount integrated circuit package; see surface-mount technology
Very Superior Old Pale, a grade label for brandy
VLBI Space Observatory Programme, a Very Long Baseline Interferometry with HALCA space radio telescope
Vienna Symphonic Orchestra Project, a series of albums performed by Vienna Symphony
Vasuvum Saravananum Onna Padichavanga, a 2015 Indian Tamil film

See also